Starmalls is one of the two retail arms of the Filipino real estate company Vista Land, the other being Vista Malls. Starmalls operates shopping malls and BPO chains in Mega Manila and Cebu.

History
Starmalls began as Polar Mines and Development Corporation on October 16, 1969. Polar Mines became Polar Property Holdings Corporation after shifting industries from mining to real estate. It was approved by the Securities and Exchange Commission (SEC) in September 2004. Polar Property became Starmalls on June 22, 2012. On September 17, 2019, SEC approved the change in corporate name to Vistamalls, Inc.

Starmall Prima
Starmall Prima was initially created to cater to higher-income customers and its first mall was inaugurated in Taguig in 2014. By 2015, Starmall Prima became Vista Malls.

Outlets

Current

Former

References

External links
 

Shopping center management firms
Companies based in Las Piñas
Polar Property
Polar Property
Real estate companies established in 2012
Retail companies established in 2012
Companies listed on the Philippine Stock Exchange